Frazer Lee is a British screenwriter, filmmaker, and novelist.

Career
Frazer Lee's novel The Lamplighters was a Bram Stoker Award for Best First Novel
Finalist in 2011. His other published works include Panic Button: The Official Movie Novelization (2011), novels Hearthstone Cottage (2019) and Greyfriars Reformatory (2020), and the Daniel Gates Adventures series of novellas (2013-2018).

Lee's film and television directing credits include On Edge (1999), Red Lines (2002), and The Stay (2015). Frazer was named one of the Top 12 UK directors in MySpace.com’s Movie Mash-up contest by a panel including representatives from 20th Century Fox, Vertigo Films and Film Four. He was awarded the Edgar Allan Poe Gothic Filmmaker Award in 2018 for The Stay.

His screenplay credits include Simone (2010) and Panic Button (2011 film), which had its market premiere at Cannes Film Festival and its public premiere at London FrightFest Film Festival after festival director Alan Jones (film critic) placed it at number one in his 'Top 5 must-see gems' for 2011.

Biography
Frazer Lee was born in Rochford, South East Essex and formed his first production company, Robber Baron Productions, in 1998. His guest speaking engagements have included The London Screenwriters Festival and The Guerilla Filmmakers Masterclass. He is Head of Creative Writing at Brunel University London and resides in Buckinghamshire, UK with his family.

Novels
 The Lamplighters, Samhain Publishing, 2011
 Panic Button: The Official Movie Novelization, All2gethr Industries, 2011
 The Jack in the Green, Samhain Publishing, 2013 
 The Skintaker, Samhain Publishing, 2015
 Hearthstone Cottage, Flame Tree Press, 2019
 Greyfriars Reformatory, Flame Tree Press, 2020 
 Damnation: The Gothic Game, Blackletter Games, 2022

Film
 On Edge, Robber Baron Productions, 1998
 Red Lines, Robber Baron Productions, 2002
 Simone, 386 Films, 2010
 Panic Button, Movie Mogul Films, 2011, with Chris Crow, John Shackleton, David Shillitoe
 The Stay, Appin Films, 2015

Novellas

The Daniel Gates Adventures
 The Lucifer Glass, Samhain Publishing, 2013
 The Leper Window, Samhain Publishing, 2015
 The Lilyth Mirror, Crossroad Press, 2018
 The Lucifer Gate, Crossroad Press, 2018

Short Fiction
 Ill Met By Moonlight (published in Lighthouse Magazine Issue 2, Dec 2003)
 Pendragon Rising (published in Maelstrom, Calvin House 2004)
 Urbane (published in Lunar Harvest, paperback, Calvin House 2005 & Read By Dawn Vol. 2, Bloody Books 2007)
 Conspiracy of Silence (published in Nocturne 5, Calvin House 2006)
 Tinsel (published in Read By Dawn Vol. 3, Bloody Books 2008)
 Hair of the Dog (published in Urbane and Other Horror Tales, 2009)
 The Minus Touch (published in Urbane and Other Horror Tales, 2009)
 Half/Life (published in Urbane and Other Horror Tales, 2009)
 To Take the Water Down and Go To Sleep (published in The Beauty of Death Volume 2, Independent Legions 2017)
 Sixpack And The Angel (published in The Sixth BHF Book of Horror Stories, BHF Books 2021)
 So Much To See (published in The Seventh BHF Book of Horror Stories, BHF Books 2021)
 Planet of the Dead (published in The Unofficial Blake's 7 Annual, Cult Edge 2023)

Audio Stories
 Doctor Who Interludes: Gobbledegook (Big Finish 2023)

Short Fiction Collections
 Urbane and Other Horror Tales (ebook & paperback, Create Space 2009)
 Ill Met By Moonlight (chapbook, Ghost Writer Publications 2009)

Edited Anthologies
 Faeries, Fiends & Flying Saucers (ebook & paperback, Brunel University London 2017)
 Wizards, Werewolves & Weird Engines (ebook & paperback, Brunel University London 2018)
 Robots, Rogues & Revenants (ebook & paperback, Brunel University London 2020)
 Myths, Monsters & Mayhem (ebook & paperback, Brunel University London 2021)

Poetry
 Some Velvet Mourning published in Horror Writers Association Poetry Showcase Volume V (ebook & paperback, Horror Writers Association 2018)

Non-fiction
 “Not everything that moves, breathes and talks is alive”: Christianity, Korean Shamanism and Reincarnation in Whispering Corridors (1998) and The Wailing (2016) – published in Scared Sacred: Idolatry, Religion and Worship in the Horror Film, editors: Rebecca Booth, Erin Thompson, R.F. Todd (House of Leaves Publishing, 2020)
 Koji Suzuki’s Ring: A world literary perspective – published in Horror Literature From Gothic to Postmodern: Critical Essays. Editors Nicholas Diak, Michele Brittany (McFarland Publishing, 2020)

Recognition
Finalist, Bram Stoker Award for Best First Novel, (The Lamplighters) 2011

Other awards and nominations
 Runner up, Geoffrey Ashe Prize, (Pendragon Rising) Library of Avalon UK 1998
 Highly Commended (On Edge) Fantastic Films Manchester UK 2000
 Best Short Film (On Edge) Halloween Filmfest Germany 2001
 Best Short Film (On Edge) (3rd) AKA Shriekfest, Los Angeles USA 2003
 Highly Commended (Red Lines) Fantastic Films Manchester UK 2003
 Best Short (Red Lines) Fearless Tales, San Francisco USA 2004
 Best Horror Short, 1st Place (On Edge) Dragon*Con Film Festival, Atlanta USA 2009
 Semi-finalist (Simone) Action/Cut Short Film Competition, USA 2010
 2nd Place (Simone) Filmslam Film Festival, USA 2010
 Award Winner (Simone) Reel Terror Film Festival, USA 2010
 Best Short, Audience Choice (Simone) Shockerfest, USA 2010
 Best Atmosphere (The Stay) Independent Horror Movie Awards, USA 2015
 Finalist Book Pipeline Competition (The Lamplighters), USA 2015
 Best Story (The Stay) Things2Fear Film Fest, USA 2016
 Semifinalist (Skindred) ScreenCraft Sci-fi Screenplay Contest, USA 2016
 Quarter-finalist (The Reformatory) ScreenCraft Horror Screenplay Contest, USA 2017
 Best Short Film (The Stay) Changing Face International Film Festival, Australia 2017
 Silver Award Winner (The Stay) Spotlight Horror Film Awards, USA 2017
 Best Horror Short Silver Award (The Stay) Independent Shorts Awards, LA USA 2018
 Outstanding Directing Award (Frazer Lee, The Stay) ZedFest, Hollywood USA 2018
 Outstanding Screen Story Award (Frazer Lee, The Stay) ZedFest, Hollywood USA 2018
 The Edgar Allan Poe Gothic Filmmaker Award 2018 (Frazer Lee, The Stay) ZedFest, Hollywood USA 2018
 Best Writer (Frazer Lee, The Stay) Couch Film Festival, Toronto Canada 2019
 Best Mystery (Frazer Lee, The Stay) Hollywood Blood Horror Festival, Los Angeles USA 2019
 Creepy Tree Exemplar Award – Best Horror Film (Standard) – Creepy New Concept & Plot (Frazer Lee, The Stay) Creepy Tree Film Festival, USA 2020
 Best International Film (Frazer Lee, The Stay) The Thing in the Basement Horror Fest, USA 2020
 Outstanding Achievement Award (Short Films, Frazer Lee, The Stay) Virgin Spring Cinefest, 2021
 Special Mention (Frazer Lee, The Stay) Vesuvius International Film Festival, 2021
 Best Horror Short (Frazer Lee, The Stay) V.i.Z. Film Awards, Bulgaria 2021
 Best Short Horror (Frazer Lee, The Stay) Cult Movies International Film Festival, 2021
 Best Horror Short (Frazer Lee, The Stay) Madrid Arthouse Film Festival, 2022
 Best Mystery Thriller (Frazer Lee, The Stay) The Cyprus Horror Society 2022 Awards
 Best Horror Short (Frazer Lee, The Stay) Austin International Art Festival 2022 
 Best Horror (Frazer Lee, The Stay) Make Art Not Fear Festival 2022

External links
Official website

References 

British filmmakers
British male novelists
Living people
Year of birth missing (living people)